Çeçen is a surname. Notable people with the name include:
Ferhan Çeçen (born 1961), Turkish environmental engineer and chemist
Mümtaz Çeçen (1876–1941), Ottoman-Turkish military officer
Timo Çeçen (born 1994), German footballer

See also
Ağrı İbrahim Çeçen University